The women's 400 metres at the 2013 Southeast Asian Games, the athletics was held in Naypyidaw, Myanmar. The track and field events took place at the Wunna Theikdi Stadiumon December 15.

Schedule
All times are Myanmar Standard Time (UTC+06:30)

Records

Results
Legend
DSQ — Disqualified
DNF — Do Not Finish

Round 1

Heat 1

Heat 2

Final

References

Athletics at the 2013 Southeast Asian Games
2013 in women's athletics